Scott Thulborn (born 1984) is a retired Australian lawn bowls player, who won the 2016 World Singles Champion of Champions.

Bowls career
In 2016, Thulborn became the World Singles Champion of Champions defeating Jonathan Tomlinson of Wales in the final. He is twice the winner of the fours event at Australian National Bowls Championships (2015 & 2016).

In 2019, he announced his retirement from the Australian squad after representing Australia on 32 occasions since 2017.

References

1984 births
Living people
Australian male bowls players